The Crotalinae, commonly known as pit vipers,  or pit adders, are a subfamily of vipers found in Eurasia and the Americas. Like all other vipers, they are venomous. They are distinguished by the presence of a heat-sensing pit organ located between the eye and the nostril on both sides of the head. Currently, 23 genera and 155 species are recognized: These are also the only viperids found in the Americas. The groups of snakes represented here include rattlesnakes, lanceheads, and Asian pit vipers. The type genus for this subfamily is Crotalus, of which the type species is the timber rattlesnake, C. horridus.

This subfamily is unique in that all member species share a common characteristic – a deep pit, or fossa, in the loreal area between the eye and the nostril on either side of the head. These loreal pits are the external openings to a pair of extremely sensitive infrared-detecting organs, which in effect give the snakes a sixth sense to help them find and perhaps even judge the size of the small, warm-blooded prey on which they feed. The pit organ is complex in structure and is similar to the thermoreceptive labial pits found in boas and pythons. It is deep and located in a maxillary cavity. The membrane is like an eardrum that divides the pit into two sections of unequal size, with the larger of the two facing forwards and exposed to the environment. The two sections are connected via a narrow tube, or duct, that can be opened or closed by a group of surrounding muscles. By controlling this tube, the snake can balance the air pressure on either side of the membrane. The membrane has many nerve endings packed with mitochondria. Succinic dehydrogenase, lactic dehydrogenase, adenosine triphosphate, monoamine oxidase, generalized esterases, and acetylcholine esterase have also been found in it. When prey comes into range, infrared radiation falling onto the membrane allows the snake to determine its direction. Having one of these organs on either side of the head produces a stereo effect that indicates distance, as well as direction. Experiments have shown, when deprived of their senses of sight and smell, these snakes can strike accurately at moving objects less than  warmer than the background. The paired pit organs provide the snake with thermal rangefinder capabilities. Clearly, these organs are of great value to a predator that hunts at night, as well as for avoiding the snake’s own predators.

Among vipers, these snakes are also unique in that they have a specialized muscle, called the muscularis pterigoidius glandulae, between the venom gland and the head of the ectopterygoid. Contraction of this muscle, together with that of the muscularis compressor glandulae, forces venom out of the gland.

Geographic range
The subfamily Crotalinae is found from Eastern Europe eastward through Asia to Japan, China, Indonesia, peninsular India, Nepal, and Sri Lanka. In the Americas, they range from southern Canada southward to Central America to southern South America.

Habitat

Crotalines are a versatile subfamily, with members found in habitats ranging from parched desert (e.g., the sidewinder, Crotalus cerastes) to rainforests (e.g., the bushmaster, Lachesis muta). They may be either arboreal or terrestrial, and at least one species (the cottonmouth, Agkistrodon piscivorus) is semiaquatic. The altitude record is held jointly by Crotalus triseriatus in Mexico and Gloydius strauchi in China, both of which have been found above the treeline at over 4,000 m above sea level.

Behavior
Although a few species of crotalines are highly active by day, such as Trimeresurus trigonocephalus, a bright green pit viper endemic to Sri Lanka, most are nocturnal, preferring to avoid high daytime temperatures and to hunt when their favored prey are also active. The snakes' heat-sensitive pits are also thought to aid in locating cooler areas in which to rest.

As ambush predators, crotalines typically wait patiently somewhere for unsuspecting prey to wander by. At least one species, the arboreal Gloydius shedaoensis of China, is known to select a specific ambush site and return to it every year in time for the spring migration of birds. Studies have indicated these snakes learn to improve their strike accuracy over time.

Many temperate species of pit vipers (e.g. most rattlesnakes) congregate in sheltered areas or "dens" to overwinter (brumate, see hibernation), the snakes benefiting from the combined heat. In cool temperatures and while pregnant, pit vipers also bask on sunny ledges. Some species do not mass together in this way, for example the copperhead,  Agkistrodon contortrix, or the Mojave rattlesnake, Crotalus scutulatus.

Like most snakes, crotalines keep to themselves and strike only if cornered or threatened. Smaller snakes are less likely to stand their ground than larger specimens. Pollution and the destruction of rainforests have caused many pit viper populations to decline. Humans also threaten pit vipers, as many are hunted for their skins or killed by cars when they wander onto roads.

Reproduction
With few exceptions, crotalines are ovoviviparous, meaning that the embryos develop within eggs that remain inside the mother's body until the offspring are ready to hatch, when the hatchlings emerge as functionally free-living young. In such species, the eggshells are reduced to soft membranes that the young shed, either within the reproductive tract, or immediately after emerging.

Among the oviparous (egg-laying) pit vipers are Lachesis, Calloselasma, and some Trimeresurus species. All egg-laying crotalines are believed to guard their eggs.

Brood sizes range from two for very small species, to as many as 86 for the fer-de-lance, Bothrops atrox, which is among the most prolific of all live-bearing snakes.

Many young crotalines have brightly coloured tails that contrast dramatically with the rest of their bodies. These tails are known to be used by a number of species in a behavior known as caudal luring; the young snakes make worm-like movements with their tails to lure unsuspecting prey within striking distance.

Taxonomy
In the past, the pit vipers were usually classed as a separate family: the Crotalidae. Today, however, the monophyly of the viperines and the crotalines as a whole is undisputed, which is why they are treated here as a subfamily of the Viperidae.

Genera

*) Not including the nominate subspecies.
) Type genus.

See also
 List of crotaline species and subspecies

References

Further reading

 Gumprecht, Andreas; Tillack, Frank (2004). "A proposal for a replacement name of the snake genus Ermia Zhang, 1993". Russian Journal of Herpetology 11: 73–76.
 Wright, Albert Hazen; Wright, Anna Allen (1957). Handbook of Snakes of the United States and Canada. Ithaca and London: Comstock Publishing Associates, a Division of Cornell University Press. 1,105 pp. (in two volumes). (Seventh Printing 1985). ("Crotalidae", p. 901).
 Goris RC (2011). "Infrared organs of snakes: an integral part of vision". Journal of Herpetology 45: 2–14.

External links

 Pit organs at Life is Short, but Snakes are Long